The General Alphabet of Cameroon Languages is an orthographic system created in the late 1970s for all Cameroonian languages. Consonant and vowel letters are not to contain diacritics, though  is a temporary exception. The alphabet is not used sufficiently for the one unique letter, a bilabial trill, to have been added to Unicode. 

Maurice Tadadjeu and Etienne Sadembouo were central to this effort.

Consonants

** Like , but with the top hook turned to the left.

Aspirated consonants are written ph, th, kh etc. Palatalized and labialized consonants are py, ty, ky and pw, tw, kw etc. Retroflex consonants are written either Cr or with a cedilla: tr, sr or ţ, ş, etc. Prenasalized consonants are mb, nd, ŋg etc. Preglottalized consonants are 'b, 'd, 'm etc. Geminant consonants are written double.

Vowels

Long vowels are written double. Nasal vowels may be written with a cedilla: a̧ etc. or with a single following nasal consonant: aŋ etc. (presumably assimilating to any following consonant), in which case VN would be written with a double nasal: aŋŋ etc.

Tones
Tone is written as in the IPA, with the addition of a vertical mark for mid-low tone:  etc. Where rising and falling tones only occur on long vowels, they are decomposed:  etc. The high tone mark is used for contrastive stress in languages that do not have tone.

See also
Pan-Nigerian alphabet
Africa Alphabet
African reference alphabet

References

External links
General Alphabet of Cameroon Languages
Alphabet camerounais
Résurrection des langues minoritaires

Latin alphabets
Writing systems of Africa
Languages of Cameroon
Multilingual orthographies
Phonetic alphabets